The Overnighters is a 2014 American documentary film written, directed and produced by Jesse Moss. The film premiered in competition category of U.S. Documentary Competition program at the 2014 Sundance Film Festival on January 18, 2014. It won the Special Jury Award at the festival.

After its premiere at the Sundance Film Festival, Drafthouse Films acquired distribution rights of the film. The film was released on October 24, 2014 in United States, with a portion of all box office receipts being donated to North Dakota's local affordable housing charities.

The film also premiered at 2014 Miami International Film Festival on March 13, 2014 and won a prize at the festival.

Synopsis
The film depicts the lives of people chasing the dream of high salaries in the North Dakota oil boom, only to discover that affordable housing is almost impossible to find. Much of the focus is on the efforts of local pastor Jay Reinke, who allowed over 1,000 different people to stay at his Williston, North Dakota church over a period of about two years.

Reception
The film received positive response from critics. Review aggregator Rotten Tomatoes gives the film a 98% rating based on reviews from 64 critics, with an average score of 8.6/10. Metacritic gives the film a score of 89 based on reviews from 20 critics, indicating "Universal Acclaim".

Justin Chang in his review for Variety said that it is "[A] tough-minded, admirably unresolved film." David Rooney of The Hollywood Reporter gave the film positive review and said that, "A scenario with present-day echoes of The Grapes of Wrath yields perceptive insights into the way we view outsiders." Katie Walsh from Indiewire in her review said that, "The Overnighters is starkly bleak and devastatingly humane, and an indelible American documentary." Colin Covert in his review for the Minneapolis Star Tribune gave the film three and half star out of four and said that, "The film features stunning third-act revelations that compel viewers to rethink its characters' actions and motivations."

Accolades

References

External links
Official website

2014 films
2014 documentary films
American documentary films
Sundance Film Festival award winners
Documentary films about petroleum
Films shot in North Dakota
Films set in North Dakota
2010s English-language films
2010s American films